Fitzek is a surname. Notable people with the surname include:

Peter Fitzek (born 1965), German political activist 
Sebastian Fitzek (born 1971), German writer and journalist

Surnames from given names